Rahul Salanke, popularly known as RK Rahul is an Indian actor, primarily from Kannada cinema.

He made his acting debut in Nannusire in 2008. He is best known for his performance in the Kannada movie Jigarthanda produced by Kannada cinema actor Sudeep's company - Kichcha Creations.
He is also known for his performance as a VJ and television host for 'Ondu Prashne Ondu Haadu' TV show on Udaya Music.

He is an opening batsman for Karnataka Bulldozers in the Celebrity Cricket League (CCL).

Personal life

Rahul Salanke was born on 14 May 1989 in Bangalore, Karnataka. He completed his schooling from St. Joseph's College, Bangalore and Bachelor's degree in Commerce from Sri Bhagawan Mahaveer Jain College, Bangalore.
Rahul obtained his MBA degree from Symbiosis International University.

Career

Rahul is the first actor to be launched by Sudeep as a main lead in his home production.

His movie Jigarthanda (2016) has been his most successful movie to date. Directed by Shiva Ganesh, 
the film was a remake of the Tamil film Jigarthanda (2014), featuring actor Siddharth.

Filmography

References

External links
 
 

1989 births
Indian male film actors
Indian male television actors
Living people
21st-century Indian male actors
Male actors in Kannada cinema
Kannada male actors
Male actors from Bangalore